is a professional Japanese baseball player. He plays infield for the Yokohama DeNA BayStars.

References 

1998 births
Living people
Baseball people from Nagano Prefecture
Japanese baseball players
Chuo University alumni
Nippon Professional Baseball infielders
Yokohama DeNA BayStars players
2023 World Baseball Classic players